Rubens Joseph (born 12 October 1968) is a Haitian judoka. He competed in the men's lightweight event at the 1992 Summer Olympics.

References

External links
 

1968 births
Living people
Haitian male judoka
Olympic judoka of Haiti
Judoka at the 1992 Summer Olympics
Place of birth missing (living people)